Joshua's Vision of St Michael or The Apparition of the Archangel Michael to Joshua is a 13th-century Russian icon. It is exhibited in Dormition Cathedral, Moscow. It shows an episode in Joshua 5.13-15 where "a man ... with a drawn sword in his hand" appeared to Joshua - that man was later interpreted as Michael the Archangel.

History
The icon seems to have originated in the church dedicated to St Michael on the site of the present-day Cathedral of the Archangel in Moscow. The earlier church was built by Mikhail Khorobrit, prince of Moscow. According to Igor Grabar, "if [the author of the icon] was not Byzantine, he was Souzdalien", although there is no precise attribution.

It and the Saviour with Gold Earrings were moved to the Cathedral of the Dormition in Moscow under Vasili III and Metropolitan Varlaam. It was discovered in the 1920s by the researchers of the Russian Restoration Commission. In 1927 it appeared in the "Third Restoration Exhibition", organised by Igor Grabar Centre for Scientific and Artistic Restoration in Russia, followed by "Russian Art of the Scythians to the Present-Day" in Paris in 1966–1967.

References

Paintings depicting Michael (archangel)
13th-century paintings
Russian icons
Paintings depicting Hebrew Bible themes